This is an incomplete list of artistic works with Orientalist influences.

Art
 David Roberts, The Holy Land, Syria, Idumea, Arabia, Egypt, and Nubia (1842)
 Théodore Chassériau, Arab Chiefs Challenging each other to Single Combat under the Ramparts of a City (1852)
 Léon Belly, Pélerins allant à La Mecque (1861)
 Gustave Guillaumet, Evening Prayer in the Sahara (1863)
 Alfred Dehodencq, Boabdil’s Farewell to Granada (1869)
 Henri Regnault, Summary Execution under the Moorish Kings of Granada (1870) 
 Jean-Joseph Benjamin-Constant, Le jour des funérailles - Scène du Maroc (1889)

Literature
 The Travels of Marco Polo, 13th century
 Travels of Sir John Mandeville, 14th century invented account of travels
 Fernão Mendes Pinto, Peregrinação (1556), the most complete of the early Portuguese written accounts of the Indic, southeast Asia, China and Japan
 Christopher Marlowe, Tamburlaine, 1588/89
 John Dryden, Aureng-zebe (1675), a heroic drama in theory based on the life of the reigning Mughal Emperor, Aurangzeb
 Antoine Galland – Les mille et une nuits (1704–1717), first European translation of Arabian Nights
 François Pétis de la Croix — Les mille et un jours (The Thousand and One Days) (1710–1712)
 Montesquieu – Persian Letters (Lettres persanes) (1721)
 Voltaire — Zadig (1747)
 James Ridley — The Tales of the Genii (1764)
 William Thomas Beckford – Vathek (1786)
 Jacques Cazotte and Dom Denis Chavis — Continuation des mille et une nuits (Continuation of the Thousand and One Nights) (1788–1790)
 Robert Southey – Thalaba the Destroyer (1801)
 Robert Southey – Curse of Kehama (1810)
 Lord Byron – his four "Turkish tales": The Bride of Abydos, The Giaour, The Corsair (1814), Lara, A Tale (1814), and other works
 Samuel Taylor Coleridge – Kubla Khan (published 1816)
 Thomas Moore – Lalla-Rookh (published 1817)
 Johann Wolfgang von Goethe – Westöstlicher Diwan (1819)
 Alexander Pushkin – Ruslan and Ludmila, (1820)
 Ralph Waldo Emerson – poem Indian Superstition (1821)
 Edgar Allan Poe – Tamerlane (1827), Al Aaraaf (1829), and Israfel (1831)
 Victor Hugo – Les Orientales (1829)
 George Meredith — The Shaving of Shagpat: An Arabian Entertainment (1856)
 Gustave Flaubert – Salammbô (1862)
 Eça de Queiroz – The Relic (A Relíquia) (1887) and The Mandarin (O Mandarim) (1889)
 Anatole France – Thaïs (1890)
 Edward FitzGerald – "translation" or adaptation of the Persian Rubaiyat of Omar Khayyam (1859)
 Pierre Loti (1850–1923) – highly popular French writer, mostly on his Oriental travels & novels set as far away as Japan and Tahiti
 Richard Francis Burton – translation of The Book of One Thousand and One Nights (1885–1888)
 Gaston Leroux – Phantom of the Opera (1911)
 Leo Tolstoy – Hadji Murat (1912)
 Victor Segalen – René Leys (1922)
 Herman Hesse – Siddhartha (1922)
 André Malraux – Man's Fate (1934) (La Condition humaine, 1933)
 George Orwell – Burmese Days (1934)
 Marguerite Yourcenar's Nouvelles Orientales (1938)

Opera, ballets, musicals

 Antonio Lucio Vivaldi – Juditha triumphans (1716)
 Georg Friedrich Händel – Tamerlano (1724) and Serse (1738)
 Jean-Georges Noverre – Les Fêtes Chinoises  (1754)
 Jean-Philippe Rameau – Les Indes Galantes (1735–1736)
 Wolfgang Amadeus Mozart – Die Entführung aus dem Serail (1782)
 Gioachino Rossini – Semiramide (1823)
 Giuseppe Verdi – Nabucco (1842)
 Jacques Offenbach – Ba-ta-clan (1855)
 Georges Bizet – Les Pêcheurs de Perles (1863)
 Giuseppe Verdi – Aida (1871)
 Emmanuel Chabrier – Fisch-Ton-Kan (1875)
 César Cui – The Mandarin's Son (1878)
 Gilbert and Sullivan – The Mikado (1885)
 Alexander Borodin – Prince Igor (1890)
 Sidney Jones – The Geisha (1896)
 Sidney Jones – San Toy (1899)
 Pietro Mascagni – Iris (1899)
 Howard Talbot – A Chinese Honeymoon (1896)
 Giacomo Puccini – Madama Butterfly (1904)
 Richard Strauss – Salome, opera in one act based on Wilde's play (1905)
 Giacomo Puccini – Turandot (1926)
 Franz Lehár – The Land of Smiles (1929)
 Sigmund Romberg – Oscar Hammerstein II and Otto Harbach – The Desert Song (1926) and film (1929)
 Richard Strauss – Die ägyptische Helena, opera with libretto by Hugo von Hofmannsthal (1929)

Orchestral works

 Mily Balakirev – Tamara Alexander Borodin – In the Steppes of Central Asia; "Polovetsian Dances" from Prince Igor Mikhail Ippolitov-Ivanov – Caucasian Sketches Modest Mussorgsky – "Dance of the Persian Slaves" from Khovanshchina Nikolai Rimsky-Korsakov – Antar; Scheherezade Gustav Mahler – Das Lied von der ErdeShorter musical pieces

 Mily Balakirev – Islamey Ludwig van Beethoven – Turkish March from The Ruins of Athens, opus 113 (1811)
 Johann Joseph Fux – partita Turcaria, inspired by the 1683 Siege of Vienna by the Turks
 Alexander Glazunov – 5 Novelettes for String Quartet, Op 15
 Albert Ketèlbey – In a Persian Market (1920), In a Chinese Temple Garden (1925), and In the Mystic Land of Egypt (1931)
 Wolfgang Amadeus Mozart – Rondo alla turca from Piano Sonata No. 11 (K.331)
 Sergei Rachmaninoff – Oriental Sketch (1917)
 Pyotr Ilyich Tchaikovsky - “Chinese Dance” and “Arabian Dance” from The NutcrackerTheatre

 Tobias Bamberg's magic stage act as "Okito" (Germany, 1893 – United States, 1908)
 Oscar Wilde's Salomé (1893, first performed in Paris 1896)
 Alexander's mentalism stage act (United States, c. 1890s–1910s)
 William Ellsworth Robinson's, magic stage act as "Chung Ling Soo" (United States, 1900–1918)
 Mary Zimmerman's "The White Snake", stage play" (United States, 2012–present)
 James Fenton's "The Orphan of Zhao", stage play" (United States & Great Britain, 2012–present)

Photography
 Emile Bechard (active in Egypt 1869–1890) (1844-?)
 Henri Bechard (active in Egypt 1870 -1880)
 Henri Chouanard (1883-1936)
 Roger Fenton
 Francis Frith
 J. Andre Garrigues (?-?) (:cs:J. André Garrigues)
 Rafael Garzón (1863-1923)
 Eric Milet (1870-1950)
 Louis Antonin Neurdein (1846-1914)
 Dmitri Ivanovich Yermakov(1846–1916)

Pulp magazines

 Oriental Stories: (1930–32), retitled The Magic Carpet Magazine (1933–34)

Films

 Intolerance (1916)
 Broken Blossoms (1919)
 The Sheik (1921)
 The Lives of a Bengal Lancer (1935)
 The Thief of Bagdad (1940)
 My Geisha (1962)
 Indiana Jones and the Temple of Doom (1984)

Comics

 The Adventures of Tintin (1929–1983)
 Carnets d'Orient by Jacques Ferrandez
 Habibi (2011)

Television
 Arabian Knights'' (1968–1969)

See also

 List of Orientalist artists
 Orientalism

References